The Worshipful Company of World Traders is one of the 110 Livery Companies of the City of London.

The Guild of World Traders was constructed  in 1985 and it became a Company in 1993. Its petition for livery status was granted by the Court of Aldermen with effect from 2000. The Worshipful Company draws its membership from the international trade fraternity, with the aim of raising awareness and understanding of, and standards of practice in, world trade.  The Company ranks 101st in the order of precedence of the City Livery Companies. Its motto is Commerce and Honest Friendship with All, taken from Thomas Jefferson's inaugural Presidential speech.

Introduction
The founding of the World Traders Association movement  gave rise to the creation of trading complexes in over 160 cities throughout the world. London was the first in Europe, built in St Katharine Docks beside the Tower of London (though this World Trade Centre closed in 1994). Over 1,000 years earlier the same land was used by the Knighten Guilde to trade in foreign goods, and in 1979 the then Lord Mayor, Sir Peter Gadsden, suggested that this tradition be revived by the creation of the Guild of World Traders to represent members of the international trading community in the City of London.

The Company's founding Master was Mr Peter Drew OBE. From the outset the World Traders were determined to be a working Guild, only accepting members from the international trade fraternity, with the aim of raising awareness and understanding of, and standards of practice in, world trade.

The Company is a member of the Financial Services Group of Livery Companies, the other 11 members of which are the Worshipful Companies of Chartered Accountants, Actuaries, Arbitrators, International Bankers, Chartered Secretaries and Administrators, Insurers, Information Technologists, City of London Solicitors, Management Consultants, Marketors, and Tax Advisers.

Activities
The UK, principally through London, has a £40bn trade surplus in financial and professional services representing 3% of UK GDP.  World Traders represent virtually every form of financial service and are committed to retaining and growing London’s services.  World traders consist largely of three groups.

Brokers
People who trade services. A great number of members work within the financial services sector of the City of London, for example, ship brokers, insurance brokers, commodity brokers, stockbrokers and currency dealers.
Traders
People who trade tangible goods and products.  These members are often importers and exporters, for example, of foodstuffs, pharmaceutical products, metals and various industrial products from doors to bridge builders.
Financial services
Professionals who have a specialty in supporting international business.  These members include lawyers, bankers, accountants, patent attorneys, academics and consultants.

World Traders are at the forefront of debates shaping the future, for example the structure of the Eurozone, banking & insurance regulation, reducing trade barriers, growing the fledgling carbon markets, and long-term sustainability of the environment and finance.

The 250 World Traders are international.  As well as UK-based British nationals, a significant number of the Livery are overseas nationals based in the UK, dual nationals, British nationals who live overseas and overseas nationals who live in their home country.  World Traders host a large number of foreign visitors looking to relocate or establish trading connections with the UK not just from primary trading partners in the EU, China, Brazil, Russia, India or Arab states of the Persian Gulf, but also from smaller countries which may benefit from personal support and contacts.

The Company’s hallmark annual event is the Tacitus Lecture, begun in 1988, now one of the largest intellectual events in the City of London’s calendar.  The event gives a senior individual an opportunity to initiate a discussion of serious concerns about world trade in a global forum.

Key dates
23 November 1974 General Assembly of the World Trade Centers Association held at London Guildhall. Alderman Richard Charvet suggested the creation of the Guild of World Traders in London.

26 November 1979 Lord Mayor Alderman Sir Peter Gadsden laid foundation stone of International House (part of the then London World Trade Centre complex) and reiterates the suggestion of the creation of the Guild of World Traders.

24 October 1985 First meeting of the Guild of World Traders in London.

15 June 1993 Grant by the Court of Aldermen to become The Company of World Traders.

9 November 1999 Petition to become The Worshipful Company of World Traders agreed by the Court of Aldermen, with effect from 1 January 2000.

25 January 2000 Company received its letters patent in a ceremony at Mansion House, from the Lord Mayor, Alderman Clive Martin.

10 July 2013 Queen Elizabeth II granted a Royal Charter to the Company.

Arms, Crest and Motto
The Arms of the Company were designed by Sir Colin Cole, Garter Principal King of Arms, and presented by him at the Installation ceremony of Alderman Sir Peter Gadsden, the Guild's new Master, in 1987.  These Arms depict five purses symbolising trade between the five continents, with the sword and wheel of St Catherine together with the water and quayside of the dock, as a reminder of the company's foundation.  The Arms are surmounted by an escarbuncle containing a medieval merchant's cap and the supporters are a dolphin borrowed from the Company of Watermen and Lightermen, who originally gave the company sanctuary in the City of London, and the sea dragon of the City as a mark of respect for its commands.

The Master's Badge of office displays the Company's coat of arms mounted on a piece of rock crystal, donated by the World Trade Centre of Rio de Janeiro, carved with an outline of five continents.

The motif on the Company tie derives from the Company's crest: it comprises the helm, torse and mantling surmounted by the wheel of St. Catherine upon which is a medieval merchant's cap.

The Company's motto is "Commerce and honest friendship with all", a quote from Thomas Jefferson's inaugural Presidential speech.

Company Officers
Master: Mrs Mary Hardy

Senior Warden: Mr Michael Shapiro

Junior Warden: Mr Michael Larsen

Clerk: Mrs Gaye Duffy

The Worshipful Company of World Traders is governed by its Master, Senior Warden, Junior Warden, and a Court of Assistants which elects the forthcoming Master and Wardens. The chief executive officer of the Company is known as the Clerk. The Master and Wardens serve the Company in their respective roles for a period of one year, after which time the Master becomes 'Immediate Past Master', the Senior Warden becomes the Master of the Company and the Junior Warden is promoted to the role of Senior Warden. A new Junior Warden is then elected by the Court of Assistants. Past Masters advise the incumbent Master and can resume as Master should the need arise. The appointment to the office of Clerk is not subject to annual election.

Past Masters

2021-22: Mrs Mary Hardy

2020-21: Ms Sue Algeo

2019-20: Mr Peter Alvey

2018–19: Dr Edwina Moreton 

2017–18: Alderman Professor Michael Mainelli 

2016–17: Mr Robert Woodthorpe Browne 

2015–16: Miss Wendy Hyde 

2014–15: Mr Mark Hardy 

2013–14: Dr Heather McLaughlin

2012–13: Mr John Burbidge-King

2011–12: Miss Mei Sim Lai 

2010–11: Mr Graham Bishop

2009–10: Mr Michael Wren

2008–09: The Baroness Garden of Frognal 

2007–08: Mr Robert Alston 

2006–07: Mr Jack Wigglesworth

2005–06: Mr William King

2004–05: Mr Eric Stobart

2003–04: Mr Eric Tracey

2002–03: Mr John Stace

2001–02: Mr Bryan Whalley 

2000–01: Miss Susan Hughes

1999–2000: Sir Roger Cork 

1998–99: Mr Peter Wildblood 

1997–98: Porfessor David Watt

1996–97: Mr Jim Davis 

1995–96: Mr Bryan Montgomery

1994–95: The Venerable Peter Delaney 

1993–94: Mr George Capon

1992–93: Mr Peter Drew 

1991–92: Patrick Pery, 6th Earl of Limerick 

1990–91: Mr Richard Charvet 

1989–90: Mr Peter Bowring 

1988–89: The Lord Bellwin of Leeds 

1987–88: Sir Peter Gadsden  FREng

1985–87: Mr Peter Drew

Company Chaplains and Church
 The Reverend Katherine Hedderley 
 All Hallows by the Tower

References

World Traders
1993 establishments in England
1993 in London